The First is a comic book series published by CrossGen featuring the First, very powerful, nearly immortal beings each based on a certain emotion. Due to CrossGen's bankruptcy in 2004, the plot of The First, both in their own self-titled comic and CrossGen's other titles, was cut short. The role of the First in the Negation War, a storyline in which the Sigil-Bearers and First were meant to defend the universe against invaders from another universe, is therefore unclear.

Characters
Altwaal is the first god and was the most powerful of all The First. He is shown as a white-haired, blue-eyed and powerfully-built superhuman with a commanding face. Altwaal was created by Solusandra who then created more of the First. He ruled the First until his love Raamia was killed. He then brought her back to life, which was against the laws of the First. After seeing what was happening to the First, he created the rift and divided the First into two houses, House Dexter and House Sinister.
Raamia was, for some time, the consort of the original god Altwaal and was killed in a failed assassination attempt on Altwaal. She was brought back from death by Altwaal.
Pyrem was one of the seven key powers among The First, self-styled gods of their galaxy. Pyrem was Altwaal's right-hand man and was told many things by Altwaal which were not shared to the other First. Pyrem was intended to be the personification of empathy. He became the war leader of the House Dexter and for many thousands of years he was the leader of the Council of House Dexter.
Ingra was one of the seven key powers among The First, self-styled gods of their galaxy. She is intended to be the personification of anger. Ingra's powers are immense. Her powers of perception allowed her to detect the Sigil-Bearers when they appeared on many distant worlds and she rapidly dispatched members of House Sinister to convert some of these Sigil-Bearers to her side. 
Trenin was one of the seven key powers among The First, self-styled gods of their galaxy. Trenin was intended to be the personification of determination or persistence. He was a friend of Pyrem but Trenin is much more judgmental than Pyrem. Trenin demands justice and he is not forgiving. Although he was one of the first of the gods, he never seems to have taken a lover and seems not to have any close friends.
Yala was intended to be the personification of joy. She is a good friend of Pyrem but spends most of her time training the younger gods of House Dexter in fighting. Yala is in love with Gannish, one of the other seven major gods. Yala and Gannish rarely meet because Gannish choose House Sinister instead of House Dexter. Yala seems content to fight or practice for battle and rarely seems interested in politics or complicated problems.
Seahn was not one of the original gods but instead was the child of two of the gods: Tulity and Braag; as a result he (and the other children of the gods) were called Secundae. Seahn is the personification of ambition. He is a natural leader and followed by many of the other Secundae of House Dexter. He often wears golden armor with green highlights on his right arm.
Persha was not one of the original gods but instead was the child of two of the gods: Pyrem and Ingra. As the child of two of the most powerful gods, she herself is nearly their equal and stronger than most other gods. Persha is the personification of perception. She is content to sit and observe events (in a sense she is something like the reader, who often sees things that Persha herself sees). She seems to have little contact with the other members of House Sinister with the exception of her mother (Ingra), Wyture and the two other major gods: Gannish and Orium.
Enson is a guide whose charge is Seahn, the most powerful and ambitious of the secundea (children of gods) in the House Dexter. Enson appears as a huge grey-skin Golem-like figure with strange horns around his mouth. He is nearly always at Seahn's side. Offering suggestions. Enson, a fragment of Danik, is trying to guide Seahn, and make him more of a leader. 
Wyture is the guide whose charge is Persha, the daughter of Ingra and Pyrem. Wyture appears as a mysterious female who is always at Persha's side. She offers suggestions to Persha. Wyture is always dressed in red and pink with a long flowing translucent cape. She has the curious ability to be in many places at nearly the same time and when someone see Wyture they often see ghostly copies of her in other locations nearby, somewhat like the indeterminate nature of an electron in an electron shell.

Publications 
The First ran for 37 issues from November 2000 till December 2003.

CrossGen released three trade paperbacks containing the first 40% of the series. Three additional books, The First Volume 4: Futile Endeavors, The First Volume 5: Liquid Alliances and The First Volume 6: Ragnarok were solicited but never published due to CrossGen's bankruptcy.

2000 comics debuts
CrossGen titles
Fantasy comics